Baek Ee-seul (born October 4, 1994) is a South Korean field hockey player. She competed for the South Korea women's national field hockey team at the 2016 Summer Olympics.

References

1994 births
Living people
South Korean female field hockey players
Olympic field hockey players of South Korea
Field hockey players at the 2016 Summer Olympics
Universiade gold medalists for South Korea
Universiade medalists in field hockey
Medalists at the 2013 Summer Universiade
21st-century South Korean women